is a city located in the central part of Saga Prefecture on the island of Kyushu, Japan. As of February 28, 2017, the city has an estimated population of 45,638 and a population density of 480 persons per km². The total area is 95.85 km².

The modern city of Ogi was established on March 3, 2005, from the merger of the former town of Ogi, absorbing the towns of Ashikari, Mikatsuki and Ushizu (all from Ogi District). Ogi District was dissolved as a result of this merger.

It has gradually come to be known as the city with the highest consumption of yōkan in Japan.

Geography
Located in the central part of Saga Prefecture, Ogi borders the city of Saga. The heart of old Ushizu where the current City Hall is located is approximately 10 km due west of central Saga. The northern part of the city is a mountainous region that builds up to the mountain Tenzan, while the rest of the city consists of the low lying Saga Plains. The southern part of the city borders the Ariake Sea.
Mountains: Tenzan
Rivers: Kase River, Ushizu River

Adjoining municipalities
Kōhoku
Saga
Shiroishi
Taku

History
1889-04-01 – The modern municipal system was established. The current city region consists of one town (Ogi) and seven villages (Ashikari, Haruta, Iwamatsu, Mikazuki, Misato, Togawa and Ushizu).
1894-04-24 – Ushizu was elevated to town status.
1932-04-01 – Haruta, Iwamatsu and Misato were all incorporated into Ogi.
1956-09-30 – Parts of Togawa was incorporated into Ushizu. The rest was incorporated into Kōhoku.
1967-04-01 – Ashikari was elevated to town status.
1969-01-01 – Mikazuki was elevated to town status.
2005-03-01 – Ogi Town absorbed Ashikari, Mikatsuki and Ushizu Towns to create Ogi City.

Education

Prefectural Senior High schools
Ogi Senior High School
Ushizu Senior High School

Municipal Junior High schools
Ashikari Junior High School
Mikazuki Junior High School
Ogi Junior High School
Ushizu Junior High School

Municipal Elementary schools
Ashikari Elementary School
Haruta Elementary School
Iwamatsu Elementary School
Mikazuki Elementary School
Misato Elementary School
Sakuraoka Elementary School
Togawa Elementary School
Ushizu Elementary School

Transportation

Air
The closest airport is Saga Airport.

Rail
The primary rail station is Ushizu Station.
JR Kyushu
Nagasaki Main Line
Ushizu Station
Karatsu Line
Ogi Station

Road
Expressways: There are no interchanges in Ogi.
National highways:
Route 34
Route 203
Route 207
Route 444
Prefectural roads: 
Ogi-Ushizu Route 42
Ushizu-Ashikari Route 43
Ogi-Fukudomi Route 44
Saga Outside Loop Route 48

References

External links

 Ogi City official website 

Cities in Saga Prefecture